The Crest Boys' Academy (formerly John Kelly Boys' Technology College) was a secondary school with academy status located in Neasden in the London Borough of Brent.

The school was founded as John Kelly Boys' School in 1958 and was set in pleasant and extensive grounds. The school was served by a number of bus routes (332, 245, 182, 16) and was close to Neasden and Dollis Hill Underground stations.

John Kelly Boys' Technology College turned into an academy on 1 September 2009, and became Crest Boys' Academy (sponsored by E-ACT). The school was situated next to Crest Girls' Academy; the schools shared a sixth form.

Due to concerns regarding the quality of education at both Crest Boys’ Academy and Crest Girls’ Academy following a grading of Satisfactory by Ofsted, an Executive Principal Phil Hearne was appointed to lead both schools. An Ofsted report in June 2013 placed the school in special measures, stating that it offered an inadequate standard of education. In October 2013 Billy O’Keeffe, the Head of School resigned. In April 2014 a new Principal Director Elroy Cahill was appointed. The Academy underwent a restructure with new teaching and leadership appointments to drive forward standards. The Crest Boys' Academy merged with the Crest Girls' Academy and Crest Sixth Form to become E-ACT Crest Academy, which moved into a new £40,000,000 building in September 2014.

Notable former pupils
 Brinsley Forde, musician for Aswad and actor
Mike Gatting, former Middlesex and England international cricketer, attended JKBTC
 Steve Gatting, former Arsenal and Brighton footballer, attended JKBTC
 Ricky Hill, former Luton Town and England international footballer, attended JKBTC
 Arthur Ted Powell, advertising art director and artist, attended JKBTC
 Tony "Gad" Robinson, musician for Aswad
 Graham Young, serial killer, the notorious 'Teacup Poisoner'

References

External links
 Crest Boys' Academy website

Boys' schools in London
Educational institutions established in 1958
1958 establishments in England
Defunct schools in the London Borough of Brent
Educational institutions disestablished in 2014
2014 disestablishments in England